Gilson Lubin is a stand-up comedian originally from Saint Lucia, West Indies. Living in Canada the comedian spent the past couple of years on the CTV programme MTV Live as a hosts/. Lubin's career has led to performances at Montreal's prestigious Just for Laughs festival winning a development deal with SpikeTv as well won a Canadian Comedy Award for Best Stand-up Newcomer category. Gilson has taken his act all over Canada, the United States and Caribbean while making appearances on many shows along the way such as Comedy Central, Premium Blend (N.Y.C) and was also featured in the January 2008 94th episode of HBO's Def Comedy Jam.

External links 
 
 Comedy Central page 
 

Black Canadian broadcasters
Canadian television personalities
Living people
Year of birth missing (living people)
Canadian Comedy Award winners
Black Canadian comedians